El Mehdi Karnass (born 12 March 1990) is a Moroccan footballer currently playing for Botola club Wydad Casablanca as a winger.

International career

International goals
Scores and results list Morocco's goal tally first.

References

1990 births
Living people
Moroccan footballers
Morocco international footballers
Moroccan expatriate footballers
Eliteserien players
Botola players
Wydad AC players
Aalesunds FK players
Expatriate footballers in Norway
Association football wingers
2020 African Nations Championship players
Morocco A' international footballers
Moroccan expatriate sportspeople in Norway
AS FAR (football) players
Difaâ Hassani El Jadidi players